Michael Sata, the President of Zambia, died on 28 October 2014 in London, United Kingdom at the age of 77, after suffered from an undisclosed severe illness few months earlier. The state funeral took place on November 11 with the funeral being attended by 9 heads of state, 9 foreign representatives, 2 heads of multilateral organizations and 2 former African political leaders.

Background
On 19 October 2014, Sata left the country for a medical check-up in the United Kingdom, leaving Defence Minister Edgar Lungu in charge in his absence. Sata's absence from public view, given that the 50th anniversary of the country's independence was 4 days away, rumours emerged on the status of Sata's health. He died in London on 28 October at King Edward VII Hospital alongside his wife, Christine, son, Mulenga, and other family members.  Vice-President Guy Scott was named acting leader until an election, making him the first democratically elected white leader of a Sub-Saharan African government since F. W. de Klerk in South Africa.

Dignitaries

Government representatives

Heads of multilateral organizations

Former leaders

See also 

 Embassy Park

References

External links
 Images of the Requiem Mass
 Images of the State Funeral
 

2014 in Zambia
Sata, Michael
Sata, Michael
State funerals in Zambia
Sata, Michael